Six Nations (or Six Nations of the Grand River) is demographically the largest First Nations reserve in Canada. As of the end of 2017, it has a total of 27,276 members, 12,848 of whom live on the reserve. It is the only reserve in North America that has representatives of all six Haudenosaunee nations living together. These nations are the Mohawk, Cayuga, Onondaga, Oneida, Seneca and Tuscarora. Some Lenape (formerly known as Delaware) also live in the territory.

The Six Nations reserve is bordered by the County of Brant, Norfolk County, and Haldimand County, with a subsection reservation, the New Credit Reserve, located within its boundaries. The acreage at present covers some  near the city of Brantford, Ontario. This represents approximately 5% of the original  of land granted to the Six Nations by the 1784 Haldimand Treaty.

History

Many of the Haudenosaunee people allied with the British during the American Revolutionary War, particularly warriors from the Mohawk, Cayuga, Onondaga and Seneca nations. Some warriors of the Oneida and Tuscarora also allied with them, as warfare was highly decentralized. These nations had longstanding trade relations with the British and hoped they might stop European-American encroachment on their territories. These allies were from the Six Nations of the Haudenosaunee (Iroquois) Confederacy.

After the colonists' victory, the British government ceded all of its territory in the colonies to their new government under a peace treaty, including that belonging to the Six Nations without consulting them or making them party to treaty negotiations. The Crown worked to resettle native Loyalists in Canada and provide some compensation for lands lost in the new United States. The Crown also hoped to use these new settlers, both Native Americans and European Americans, to develop agriculture and towns in areas west of Quebec, the territory later known as Upper Canada.

The new lands granted to Six Nations reserves were all near important Canadian military targets and placed along the border to prevent any American invasion. The growth of the Six Nations community was also hampered. Land, especially in the 17th and 18th centuries, granted a certain measure of power to their owners. Influential leaders such as Joseph Brant and Deseronto were prevented from granting land to business owners who could have brought industry and agriculture to their lands. Rules and laws were created to prevent the growth of political support for these men by banning all non natives from living and owning any business on reserves. Many complained that much of lands granted were clay and rock ridden, making the land untenable.

After the war, Mohawk leaders John Deseronto and Joseph Brant met with the British officer Frederick Haldimand to discuss the loss of their lands in New York. Haldimand promised to resettle the Mohawk near the Bay of Quinte, on the northeast shore of Lake Ontario, in present-day Ontario, Canada. (There are of course questions about First Nations understanding of such purchase). About 200 Mohawk settled with Deseronto at what is now called the Tyendinaga Mohawk Territory, Ontario. The group of Mohawk originally led by John Deseronto, who died in the town named after him, settled on the Bay of Quinte known as Tyendinaga. These were primarily Mohawk of the Lower Castle (of New York).

Six Nations at Grand River
Brant decided that he preferred to settle on the Grand River north of Lake Erie. Mohawk of the Upper Castle joined him in settling on the Grand River, as did bands of the other Six Nations. By the Haldimand Proclamation of October 25, 1784, the government granted a tract of land to the Mohawk Nation and Six Nations bands in appreciation of their support for The Crown during the revolution. The Crown had purchased the lands previously from the Mississauga on May 22, 1784 as part of the Between the Lakes Treaty. Joseph Brant led a large group of Iroquois to settle in what is now referred to as "Six Nations of the Grand River."

A 1785 census recorded 1,843 Natives living on the Grand River reserve, including 548 Mohawk, 281 Cayuga, 145 Onondaga, 262 Oneida, 109 Tuscarora, and 98 Seneca. There were also 400 persons from other tribes, including Lenape, and others from southern territory, such as the Nanticoke, Tutelo, and some Creek and Cherokee. African-American slaves were also brought to Six Nations and Brantford by Joseph Brant. Brant encouraged members of his family to marry local Blacks, absorbing them into the population on the reserve. From the 1830s to the 1860s many runaway slaves, escaping through the Underground Railroad, were received and absorbed into the population of Six Nations. Along with the African-Americans who settled largely in the area around Cainsville, Joseph Brant invited several Anglo-American white families to live on the grant, particularly veterans of Brant's Volunteers and Butler's Rangers from New York, who had fought with him during the war. To encourage his loyalist friends to settle there, Brant gave them larger grants than the government had given other loyalists in other areas of Upper Canada. Some Canadians objected to Brant giving such land grants to whites in the reserve area. This was the beginning of attempts to curtail any growth Brant might secure for his people.

As the government did for European Americans, the Indian department provided the Haudenosaunee with some tools and other provisions for resettlement, including such items as saws, axes, grindstones, and chisels. They received help in establishing schools and churches, and in acquiring farm equipment and other necessities. Conditions were extremely difficult in the first years on the frontier, as the government did not provide enough supplies or assistance to any of the resettled loyalists, neither Native Americans nor European Americans. They had to create new settlements out of woodlands. In 1785, the government built the first Protestant church in Upper Canada (now Ontario) on the reserve; it was known as Her Majesty's Royal Chapel of the Mohawks. The Crown maintained its support of this chapel, and it is among only twelve Chapels Royal in the world.

The main town developed at what is now Brantford. It was first called Brant's Town after Joseph Brant, who built his residence there. In 1798, it was described as a large and sprawling settlement. Brant's home was a handsome two-story house, built in a European-American style. In 1797, Brant founded one of the earliest Masonic Lodges in Upper Canada; he achieved the rank of its Worshipful Master.

Governor John Simcoe confirmed the Grant with a limited deed on January 14, 1793. This deed did not extend to the source of the Grand River, territory to which the Six Nations have maintained they were entitled as described in the earlier Haldimand Proclamation. Also, this deed forbade them to sell the land to anyone but each other and the king. Led by Joseph Brant, the chiefs rejected the deed. In 1795, the Grand River chiefs empowered Joseph Brant to sell large blocks of land in the northern section, which the Haudenosaunee were not using at the time. They set terms of no money down because they wanted to take their payment entirely in future years as annual interest. At this time, the population on the reserve was declining; some Haudenosaunee left the Grand River for traditional native communities in New York. After Brant's land sales started in 1795, the population began to increase again. He and the chiefs insisted on annuities to help the Six Nations community survive.

According to the Haldimand Proclamation, the original tract of land stretched from the mouth of the Grand River on the shores of Lake Erie to the river's head, and for 10 km (6 mi) from either bank. However, the grant of land included land around the source that the Crown had not purchased from the Mississauga. A purchase from the Mississauga was later arranged, but not carried out. Between 1795 and 1797, Joseph Brant sold  to land speculators; the property comprising the northern half of the reserve was sold for £85,332. This was the highest price paid to Haudenosaunee up to this time for undeveloped land.

Governor Simcoe opposed the land sales. The interest on the annuity promised an income to the people of £5,119 per year, far more than any other Iroquois people had received.  The land speculators were unable to sell farm-size lots to settlers fast enough. By 1801, however, all the land speculators had fallen behind in their payments. Because of the lack of payments, Brant was determined to sell more land to make up for the missing payments.

In 1796, Lord Dorchester issued another deed for the land. This empowered the Haudenosaunee to lease or sell their land, provided they offered it first for sale to the government. Brant rejected this deed, partly because the deed named the Six Nations as communal owners of the land. He believed the deed should be limited to the current persons living on the land.

By 1800, two-thirds of the Haudenosaunee had not yet adapted to the style of subsistence agriculture maintained by separate households that the Canadian government encouraged.  Brant had hoped that sales of land to European Americans would help them develop the frontier, but conditions were difficult for such agriculture.

In 1828, chief John Brant was appointed resident superintendent for the Six Nations of the Grand River.

The Six Nations people were originally given 10 km (6 miles) on either side of the entire length of the Grand River, although much of the land was later sold. The ongoing Grand River land dispute is the result of disputes over the sale process. The current reserves encompass 184.7 km2 (71 sq mi), all but 0.4 km2 (100 acres) in Six Nations reserve No. 40.

In the late 19th century, the Scottish doctor Joseph Bell excavated skulls of indigenous people in the six nations. These skulls reached Berlin through the mediation of the doctor William Osler, where they were considered untraceable for decades. In 2020, the journalists David Bruser and Markus Grill, supported by the ethnologist Nils Seethaler, succeeded in finding the skulls in the anatomical collection of the Berlin Society for Anthropology, Ethnology and Prehistory. A return of the skulls to the care of the community of origin was suggested in this context.

Communities
Several named communities exist within the Six Nations reserve:
Beavers Corner
Longboat Corners
Medina Corners
Millers Corner
Ohsweken
St. Johns
Sixty-Nine Corners
Smith Corners
Smoothtown
Sour Spring
Stoneridge

Members

They later welcomed to the reserve a group of Lenape, who speak Munsee, an Algonquian language.

Six Nations of the Grand River is the most populous reserve in Canada. As of December 2013, there were 25,660 band members, of whom 12,271 lived on the reserve. The population consists of the following bands:

* not mentioned in March 2013 statistics.

Government
The Six Nations of the Grand River Elected Council is a governing body established to run the affairs of the reserve in 1924, formed under the Indian Act. The Elected Council has, since its foundation, been the primary government of Six Nations recognised by the Government of Canada. However, the Haudenosaunee Confederacy Chiefs Council has maintained a presence on the reserve despite the establishment of the elected council, representing a continuity with the traditional government of the Haudenosaunee Confederacy.

Notable people

Education 
Prior to colonization, education in Haudenosaunee communities took place in "unstructured and non-coercive ways." This continues to this day alongside state education.

Members of the Six Nations attended the Mohawk Institute, a residential school which was the subject of numerous abuse allegations. Upon closure of the institute in 1972, the residential school was replaced by the Woodland Cultural Centre.

Day schools were also operated on the reserve under the Six Nations School Board (1878–1933), the first Indigenous school board in Ontario. While the official colonial curriculum was taught and many non-Indigenous teachers taught on the reserve, Indigenous influence on the board allowed for the hiring of many Six Nations teachers, many of them women as was and continues to be the case at the elementary level in Ontario. Teachers on the reserve also formed their own association for professional development, the Six Nations Teacher's Organization.

See also
 Bell Homestead National Historic Site
 Caledonia land dispute
 Grand River
 Haldimand Proclamation
 List of townships in Ontario
 Six Nations Polytechnic
 Oneida people
 Oneida Indian Nation
 Oneida Nation of the Thames
 Oneida Nation of Wisconsin

References

Footnotes

Bibliography
 Graymont, Barbara, The Iroquois in the American Revolution, 1972, 
 Johnson, Charles M., The Valley of the Six Nations: A Collection of Documents on the Indian Lands of Grand River, Toronto: Champlain Society Publications, 1964. e-
 
 Taylor, Alan, The Divided Ground, 2006,

External links

 Six Nations of the Grand River website
 Chiefswood National Historic Site

Iroquois populated places
Cayuga
First Nations governments in Ontario
Grand River (Ontario)
Lenape
Mohawk tribe
Seneca tribe
Oneida
Onondaga
Tuscarora
 
Populated places on the Grand River (Ontario)